Zhongguancun Subdistrict is a subdistrict on the southeast of Haidian District, Beijing, China. It shares border with Qinghuayuan Subdistrict and Dongsheng Town in the north, Xueyuan Road, Huayuan Road and Beitaipingzhuang Subdistricts in the east, Beixiaguan Subdistrict in the south, Haidian and Yanyuan Subdistricts in the west. It had 130,672 inhabitants in 2020. 

During the Ming dynasty, this area was used as a burial ground for eunuchs, thus was given the name Zhongguanfen. Later settlements in this region also use the name Zhongguan, which was changed to Zhongguancun in 1949.

History

Administrative Divisions 
As of 2020, Zhongguancun Subdistrict had direct jurisdiction over 30 communities:

See also 
 List of township-level divisions of Beijing
 Zhongguancun

References 

Haidian District

Subdistricts of Beijing